Waskesiu means elk or red deer in Cree and may refer to:

Waskesiu Lake, Saskatchewan, a community in Saskatchewan, Canada
Waskesiu Lake, a lake in Saskatchewan, Canada
Waskesiu River, a river in Saskatchewan, Canada
Waskesiu Hills, a plateau in Saskatchewan, Canada